The 2019 Tennessee Volunteers football team represented the University of Tennessee in the 2019 NCAA Division I FBS football season. The Volunteers played their home games at Neyland Stadium in Knoxville, Tennessee, and competed in the Eastern Division of the Southeastern Conference (SEC). They were led by second-year head coach Jeremy Pruitt.

Tennessee finished the regular season at 7–5 overall, 5–3 in the SEC, and were bowl eligible for the first time since 2016. On January 2, the Volunteers won the Gator Bowl over Indiana to finish at 8–5 for the season.

Previous season

The Volunteers finished the 2018 season 5–7, 2–6 in SEC play to finish in last place in the Eastern Division.

Preseason

2019 recruiting class

SEC media poll

The 2019 SEC Media Days were held July 15–18 in Birmingham, Alabama. In the preseason media poll, Tennessee was projected to finish in fifth in the East Division.

Preseason All-SEC teams

The Volunteers had one player selected to the preseason all-SEC teams.

Specialists

2nd team

Marquez Callaway – return specialist

Schedule

Tennessee announced its 2019 football schedule on September 18, 2018. The 2019 schedule consists of eight home and four away games in the regular season.

Schedule Source:

Game summaries

Georgia State

Sources:

BYU

Sources:

Chattanooga

Sources:

at Florida

Sources:

Georgia

Mississippi State

Sources:

at Alabama

Sources:

South Carolina

Sources:

UAB

Sources:

at Kentucky

Sources:

at Missouri

Sources:

Vanderbilt

Sources:

Indiana

Sources:

Personnel

Roster and staff

Current depth chart
Source:

Rankings

Players drafted into the NFL

References

Tennessee
Tennessee Volunteers football seasons
Gator Bowl champion seasons
Tennessee Volunteers football